Rough Creek may refer to:

Rough Creek (Conasauga River tributary), a stream in Georgia
Rough Creek (Missouri)
Rough Creek (Idaho), a primary outflow of Rough Lake, in the White Cloud Mountains Custer County, Idaho
Rough Creek, an historical name of the Rough River in west-central Kentucky
Rough Creek (Paluxy River tributary), stream in Texas